The year 1601 CE in science and technology included many events, some of which are listed below.

Computer science
 January 1 – Retrospectively the epoch reference date from which ANSI dates are counted in COBOL and other computer languages, and the base of Windows FILETIME timestamps which are stored as a 63 bit counter, whose last valid timestamp is 30828/9/14 02:48:05.4775807.

Exploration
 August 26 – Olivier van Noort completes his circumnavigation of the world.

Mathematics
 Johannes Kepler is appointed imperial mathematician to the Habsburg Empire.

Physiology and medicine
 Giulio Cesare Casseri publishes a treatise on the anatomy of the vocal and auditory organs  in Ferrara.

Births
 possible date – Edward Somerset, 2nd Marquess of Worcester, English inventor (d. 1667)

Deaths
 October 24 – Tycho Brahe, Danish astronomer (b. 1546)

References

 
17th century in science
1600s in science